Alsat-1B is an Algerian satellite operated by the Agence Spatiale Algerienne for agricultural and disaster monitoring. The contract for the mission was signed in July 2014. The satellite is based on the SSTL-100 bus. The satellite weighs  and carries an earth imaging payload with  panchromatic imager and  multispectral cameras.

Construction
The satellite had high participation from ASAL, with eighteen engineers that worked on assembly, integration, and test. Additionally, at the University of Surrey, 18 students used the satellite as a part of their graduate degree research.

Launch
The satellite was launched on 26 September 2016 into a  altitude polar orbit by ISRO using the PSLV-C35 rocket. It was launched with several other satellites. The primary payload was SCATSAT 1, which was launched into a Polar Sun Synchronous Orbit. This was the first time PSLV launched satellites into different orbits. Algeria had three satellites that it will operate launch in that group, which were AlSat-1B, AlSat 2B, and AlSat-Nano. AlSat-2B also had imaging capabilities, but they are higher  resolution than AlSat-1B. Of the eight satellites launched by PSLV, five of them were foreign. The remaining satellites were BlackSky Pathfinder 1, Pratham, PISat, and CanX 7.

Alsat-1B uses three body mounted solar panels for power generation, and a 15 Amp-hour Li-Ion battery for power storage. It uses warm gas, butane powered resistojets for propulsion. The attitude control system uses sun sensors and magnetometers.

References 

Spacecraft launched in 2016
Earth imaging satellites
Satellites of Algeria
Spacecraft launched by PSLV rockets

Related articles
Algeria national space programs